The Team technical routine competition of the Synchronised swimming events at the 2011 World Aquatics Championships was held on July 18 with the preliminary round held and the final on July 19.

Medalists

Results
The preliminary round was held on July 18. The final was held on July 19.

Green denotes finalists

References

External links
2011 World Aquatics Championships: Team technical routine start list, from OmegaTiming.com; retrieved 2011-07-17.

Team technical routine